A Bold Stroke for a Husband is a 1783 comedy play by the British writer Hannah Cowley. The title is a variation on Susanna Centlivre's A Bold Stroke for a Wife.

The original Covent Garden cast included William Thomas Lewis as Don Julio, Richard Wroughton as Don Carlos, John Quick as Don Caesar, John Edwin as Don Vincentio, Richard Wilson as Gasper, John Whitfield as Don Garcia, James Fearon as Vasquez, Mary Robinson as Victoria, Sarah Maria Wilson as Minette, Mary Whitfield as Laura, Harriet Pitt as Sancha and Isabella Mattocks as Olivia. The epilogue was written by John O'Keeffe.

The play is in five acts and is set in Madrid.

References

Bibliography
 Nicoll, Allardyce. A History of English Drama 1660–1900: Volume III. Cambridge University Press, 2009.
 Hogan, C.B (ed.) The London Stage, 1660–1800: Volume V. Southern Illinois University Press, 1968.

External links
 

1783 plays
Comedy plays
West End plays
Plays by Hannah Cowley
Plays set in Spain